Brendan Michael Harris (born August 26, 1980) is an American retired professional baseball infielder. He played in Major League Baseball for the Chicago Cubs, Montreal Expos/Washington Nationals, Cincinnati Reds, Tampa Bay Devil Rays, Minnesota Twins and Los Angeles Angels of Anaheim.

Early years
Harris grew up in Queensbury, New York and led the Queensbury High School Spartans to the 1996 and 1998 State Baseball Tournament. He subsequently attended the College of William and Mary, where he was a third-team College All-American and Colonial Athletic Association All-Star in 2001, when he hit .390 with 18 home runs and 69 RBI. In 2000 and 2001, he played collegiate summer baseball with the Hyannis Mets of the Cape Cod Baseball League and was named a league all-star in 2000. He was selected in 5th round of the 2001 Major League Baseball Draft by the Chicago Cubs and signed with the Cubs on July 21, 2001. He was inducted into the William and Mary Athletic Hall of Fame in 2012 along with fellow alum and current Pittsburgh Steelers Head Coach Mike Tomlin. He was active with the MLB Player's Association as a Player Representative with the Rays and the Twins.

Professional career

Chicago Cubs
Harris began his professional career in 2001 with the Lansing Lugnuts of the Midwest League and hit .274 in 32 games. In 2002, with the Daytona Cubs, he hit .329 in 110 games, including 13 homers and 54 RBI. He was selected as a Florida State League All-Star and also a High-A All-Star, leading to a promotion to the AA West Tenn Diamond Jaxx at the end of the season. In 2003, he played in 120 games with the Diamond Jaxx and hit .280.

He began 2004 with the Iowa Cubs in the AAA Pacific Coast League and hit .311 in 69 games, leading to his first Major League call-up with the Cubs.

Harris made his major-league debut on July 6, 2004, as the starting third baseman against the Milwaukee Brewers. His first Major League hit was an RBI double off Víctor Santos in the third inning. In three games with the Cubs, he had two hits in nine at-bats.

Montreal Expos/Washington Nationals
He was sent at the July 31 trade deadline to the Montréal Expos as part of an eight-player, four-team trade that sent brought Nomar Garciaparra and Matt Murton to Chicago, Doug Mientkiewicz and Orlando Cabrera to the Boston Red Sox, minor leaguer Justin Jones to the Minnesota Twins and Harris, Francis Beltrán and Alex Gonzalez to Montreal. Harris appeared in 20 games for Montréal, batting .160 with one home run and two RBI in 50 at-bats. His home run, the first of his MLB career, was hit on September 15, off Josias Manzanillo of the Florida Marlins. He also played in 35 games in AAA for the Edmonton Trappers and hit .285 for them.

The Expos moved to Washington, D. C. in 2005 and became the Washington Nationals. Harris spent most of 2005 and 2006 with the new AAA affiliate, the New Orleans Zephyrs, where he hit .270 in 127 games in 2005 and .283 in 59 games in 2006.  With the Nationals, he only appeared in 4 games in 2005 (3 for 9 with 1 homer) and 17 games in 2006 (8 for 32).

Cincinnati Reds
On July 13, 2006, he was sent by Washington along with Gary Majewski, Bill Bray, Daryl Thompson, and Royce Clayton to the Cincinnati Reds in exchange for Felipe López, Austin Kearns, and Ryan Wagner. He played in 43 games with the Louisville Bats in the International League, hitting .324. with the Reds, he was in only eight games and was 2 for 10 with one homer.

Tampa Bay Devil Rays

Harris was sold to the Tampa Bay Devil Rays on January 2, 2007 and spent the majority of the season as the Devil Rays starting shortstop. In 137 games, he hit .286 with 12 homers and 59 RBI. He was voted the Rays Heart and Hustle Award winner at the end of the season.

Minnesota Twins
On November 28, 2007, the Rays traded Harris (along with Jason Pridie and Delmon Young) to the Minnesota Twins for Matt Garza, Jason Bartlett, and Eduardo Morlan.

Harris saw considerable playing time with the Twins in 2008, 2009, and 2010 as a utility player. He played short stop, second base and third base and even a few games at first base.

Harris also saw his first post-season action when the Twins faced the New York Yankees in the 2009 American League Division Series. On October 11, 2009, he was the last Major League batter in Metrodome history as the Yankees defeated the Twins 4-1 in Game 3, eliminating the Twins from the playoffs.

Harris was the front-runner to start at third base for the Twins in 2010, but Nick Punto got the nod on Opening Day. Punto was later replaced by rookie Danny Valencia and on June 24, Harris was outrighted to Triple-A Rochester after a 5-0 loss to the Milwaukee Brewers.

In three seasons with the Twins, Harris hit .251 in 296 games with 14 home runs and 90 RBI. The Twins were Central Division Champions in 2009 and 2010.

Baltimore Orioles
On December 9, 2010, the Baltimore Orioles acquired Harris in a trade along with J. J. Hardy for minor-league pitchers Brett Jacobson and Jim Hoey.

He spent the entire season in AAA with the Norfolk Tides and hit .225 with 10 homers and 50 RBI in 136 games, after which he became a free agent.

Colorado Rockies
Harris signed a minor league contract with the Colorado Rockies on January 6, 2012. He played for the Colorado Springs Sky Sox and hit .317 with 9 homers and 63 RBI in 106 games.

Los Angeles Angels of Anaheim
On November 15, 2012, Harris signed a Minor League contract with an invitation to Spring Training with the Los Angeles Angels of Anaheim. He made the Angels opening day roster as a utility player, and hit .206 with 4 HR in 44 games for he Angels, while playing SS, 2b, 3b, 1B and LF. They designated Harris for assignment on July 20, 2013 and he elected free agency three days later.

New York Yankees
Harris signed a minor league deal with the New York Yankees on July 26, 2013 and played in 22 games for the Scranton/Wilkes-Barre RailRiders, where he hit .233. He was released on August 20.

Texas Rangers
Harris signed a minor league deal with the Texas Rangers one day later, on August 21. With the Round Rock Express, he was in 12 games and had 10 hits in 41 at-bats (.244).

Los Angeles Dodgers
Harris signed a minor league contract with the Los Angeles Dodgers on November 18, 2013, that included an invitation to spring training. He played in six games for the AAA Albuquerque Isotopes and had five hits in 15 at-bats before he was released on April 12, 2014.

Detroit Tigers
Harris signed a minor league contract with the Detroit Tigers for the 2015 season. He was released on June 29, 2015.

Post-playing career
In February 2016, he was hired by the Los Angeles Angels to join their player development department. In May 2016, Harris enrolled in the MBA for Executives program at The Wharton School of the University of Pennsylvania. He resides in Arlington, VA.

In November 2019, Harris was hired by x10 Capital, a private equity firm based in San Francisco, CA.

References

External links

1980 births
Living people
Albuquerque Isotopes players
American expatriate baseball players in Canada
Baseball players from New York (state)
Chicago Cubs players
Cincinnati Reds players
Colorado Springs Sky Sox players
Daytona Cubs players
Edmonton Trappers players
Hyannis Harbor Hawks players
Iowa Cubs players
Long Island Ducks players
Lansing Lugnuts players
Los Angeles Angels scouts
Los Angeles Angels players
Louisville Bats players
Major League Baseball infielders
Minnesota Twins players
Montreal Expos players
New Orleans Zephyrs players
Norfolk Tides players
People from Queensbury, New York
Rochester Red Wings players
Round Rock Express players
Scranton/Wilkes-Barre RailRiders players
Sportspeople from Albany, New York
Tampa Bay Devil Rays players
Toledo Mud Hens players
Washington Nationals players
West Tennessee Diamond Jaxx players
William & Mary Tribe baseball players